Yumiko Shirai (born 15 March 1967) is a Japanese mangaka. She is best known for her manga Wombs, winner of the 2017 Nihon SF Taisho Award.

Life 
She was born in Ehime prefecture. She graduated from Kyoto City University of Arts1.

In 2007, her manga Tenkensai, published as a dōjinshi (self-publication), won the encouragement prize in the manga category of the 11th Japan Media Arts Festival. It was then published in magazine by Sanctuary Publishing in 2008.

Starting in 2009, Yumiko Shirai created the manga Wombs, which was published as a monthly series in Shōgakukan's Monthly Ikki magazine. Following the disappearance of the magazine, the publication of Wombs continued online, and the author took five years to deliver the fifth and final volume. In 2010, Wombs was selected by the jury of the 14th Japan Media Arts Festival, manga category.

From 2013 to 2015, she published a new series, Rafnas, in Futabasha's Monthly Action magazine, which was part of the jury's selection for the manga category of the 19th Japan Media Arts Festival in 2015. From 2016 to 2017, Yumiko Shirai published several short stories within the Mechanical Myth series published in Akita Shoten publisher's Mystery Bonita magazine.

In 2017, Wombs received the 37th Nihon SF Taisho Award.

In 2017, Yumiko Shirai became a member of Science Fiction and Fantasy Writers of Japan.

From May 2018 until 2019, she published the series Osaka Circular Barrier City which tells the fate of the city of Osaka in the near future.

In 2020, Yumiko Shirai began publishing a Wombs Cradle series, a prequel to Wombs which is published on publisher Futabasha's web site.

In 2021, the Wombs series was translated and published in French, by Akata editions and met with a positive reception, critics noting that the manga renews the themes of science fiction.

Works

References

External links 

 Yumiko Shirai comics

1967 births
Manga artists
Living people